Druga Liga means Second League in Bosnian, Croatian, Montenegrin, Polish, Serbian and Slovenian, may refer to:

Druga Liga Federacija Bosne i Hercegovine, (Second League of Federation of Bosnia and Herzegovina), third football division of Bosnia and Herzegovina
Druga Hrvatska Nogometna Liga, Croatian football second division
Druga Crnogorska Liga, Montenegrin football second division
Polish Second League, Polish football second division, called in Polish Druga Liga
Druga Liga Republike Srpske, (Second League of Republika Srpska), third football division of Bosnia and Herzegovina
Druga Slovenska Nogometna liga, Slovenian football second division
Yugoslav Second League, defunct Yugoslav football second division

See also
Prva Liga (disambiguation)
Ukrainian Second League
2. Liga (disambiguation)